Casablanca-Settat is one of the twelve administrative regions of Morocco. It covers an area of 20,166 km² and recorded a population of 6,861,739 in the 2014 Moroccan census, 69% of which lived in urban areas. The capital of the region is Casablanca.

Geography
Casablanca-Settat is located on the Atlantic coast. It borders the regions of Rabat-Salé-Kénitra to the northeast, Béni Mellal-Khénifra to the southeast, and Marrakesh-Safi to the south. Part of the border with Marrakesh-Safi follows the course of the Oum Er-Rbia River, which flows northwest and empties into the Atlantic at Azemmour. The river divides the region into two plains, the Doukkala in the west and the Chaouia in the east. Several reservoirs provide water for the region, including that of the Al Massira Dam on the Oum Er-Rbia and one on the Oued Mellah south of Mohammedia.

History
Casablanca-Settat was formed in September 2015 by merging Grand Casablanca with the provinces of El Jadida and Sidi Bennour in Doukkala-Abda region and the provinces of Benslimane, Berrechid and Settat in Chaouia-Ouardigha region.

Government
Mustapha Bakkoury, a member of the Authenticity and Modernity Party, was elected as the first president of Casablanca-Settat's regional council on 14 September 2015. Khalid Safir was appointed governor (wali) of the region on 13 October 2015. He was succeeded by Abdelkébir Zahoud in 2017.

Subdivisions

Casablanca-Settat comprises two prefectures and seven provinces:
 Benslimane Province
 Berrechid Province
 Casablanca Prefecture
 El Jadida Province
 Médiouna Province
 Mohammadia Prefecture
 Nouaceur Province
 Settat Province
 Sidi Bennour Province

Economy
Casablanca-Settat had a gross domestic product of 290 billion Moroccan dirhams in 2013, accounting for 32% of Morocco's GDP and ranking first among Moroccan regions. Its economy is primarily based on services and industry. In addition, the Doukkala area in the west is noted for its agricultural output.

Infrastructure
The A3, A5, and A7 expressways connect Casablanca with Rabat, Safi (via El Jadida), and Marrakesh (via Berrechid and Settat) respectively. There is also an expressway running from Berrechid to Beni Mellal. Railways link the region with Marrakesh to the south, Oued Zem to the southeast, and Rabat and other Moroccan cities to the northeast. The ports at Casablanca, Jorf Lasfar and Mohammedia ranked second through fourth nationally by tonnage in 2014. Mohammed V International Airport, located 20 km south of Casablanca in Nouaceur Province, is Morocco's busiest airport, handling nearly eight million passengers in 2014. The country's only oil refinery in Mohammedia shut down in August 2015.

References

External links